Claudio Matteini (May 31, 1923 – January 18, 2003) was an Italian professional football player.

He played for 2 seasons (29 games, no goals) in the Serie A for A.S. Roma.

External links
Almanaco Giallorosso  

1923 births
2003 deaths
Italian footballers
Serie A players
A.S. Roma players
Ternana Calcio players

Association football midfielders